Alberto Chaíça (born 17 September 1973, Caparica) is a Portuguese long-distance runner.

His best result to date has been a finish in 4th place in the marathon at the 2003 World Championships in Athletics in Paris. He competed in the marathon at the 2004 Olympics finishing 8th. He also finished 8th in the marathon at the 2006 European Athletics Championships in Gothenburg.

Achievements

External links

1973 births
Living people
Portuguese male marathon runners
Athletes (track and field) at the 2004 Summer Olympics
Olympic athletes of Portugal